Mark Dosch (born 1960) is an American politician. He is a member of the North Dakota House of Representatives from the 32nd District, serving since 2000. He is a member of the Republican party.

References

Living people
Republican Party members of the North Dakota House of Representatives
1960 births
21st-century American politicians